The 1930 Melbourne Cup was a two-mile handicap horse race which took place on Tuesday, 4 November 1930.

The placegetters were:

See also

 Melbourne Cup
 List of Melbourne Cup winners
 Victoria Racing Club

References

External links
1930 Melbourne Cup Field footyjumpers.com

1930
Melbourne Cup
Melbourne Cup
20th century in Melbourne
1930s in Melbourne